Stormy Trails is a 1936 American Western film directed by Sam Newfield and written by Phil Dunham. It is based on the 1934 novel Stampede by E.B. Mann. The film stars Rex Bell, Bob Terry, Lois Wilde, Lane Chandler, Earl Dwire and Lloyd Ingraham. The film was released on December 23, 1936, by Colony Pictures.

Plot

Cast            
Rex Bell as Tom Storm
Bob Terry as Billy Storm 
Lois Wilde as Connie Curlew
Lane Chandler as Dunn 
Earl Dwire as Steve Varick 
Lloyd Ingraham as Curlew
Karl Hackett as Max Durante 
Earle Ross as T.J. Thurman
Murdock MacQuarrie as Sheriff 
Jimmy Aubrey as Shives 
Roger Williams as Mike Daniels

References

External links
 

1936 films
American Western (genre) films
1936 Western (genre) films
Films directed by Sam Newfield
American black-and-white films
1930s English-language films
1930s American films